Yvon Durelle (October 14, 1929 – January 6, 2007), was a Canadian champion boxer.  He was of Acadian descent.

Early life
From a family of fourteen children, Yvon Durelle grew up in Baie-Ste-Anne, a small Acadian fishing village on Miramichi Bay on the Atlantic coast. Like many others of his generation, he left school at an early age to work on a fishing boat. In his spare time, Durelle liked to box and while still working in the fishery, he began prize fighting on weekends.

Career 
Billed as The Fighting Fisherman, Durelle began his professional career in 1948, boxing at various venues around the province of New Brunswick. By August 1950, Yvon showed only one defeat in twenty three starts, the lone blemish a loss by disqualification, to Billy Snowball. Over time he was gaining a reputation as a tough opponent with a hard punch. A large fan following in Chatham, one in Newcastle and as well in Fredericton resulted in a groundswell of popularity as his victories eventually made him one of the top ranked middleweight fighters in Canada.

Championship years
In May 1953, Durelle won the Canadian middleweight championship. He defended his title, winning 8 straight bouts. He moved up in weight class to fight in the light heavyweight division.

Light Heavyweight 
In his first fight against a heavier and stronger opponent, he defeated the Canadian champion to take the light-heavyweight title. The following year, he fought outside his native Canada for the first time, going to Brooklyn, New York to fight Floyd Patterson, an up-and-coming American Golden Gloves champion. Outpointed in 8 rounds by the man who soon became the heavyweight champion of the world, Durelle's strong performance in a losing cause against Patterson gained him wide respect in the international boxing world.

In New York City in March 1957, Durelle broke into the top ten world rankings with a 10-round decision over Angelo Defendis. In May he won the British Empire light-heavyweight championship and the following month fought the top-ranked contender in the world, Tony Anthony. In a fight most experts say he won handily, Durelle was given only a draw against the heavily favored Anthony but it elevated him to the number 3 ranking in the world. He became a much talked about sports personality in his native country after he beat the German champion, Willi Besmanoff. In 1958, he defeated Clarence Hinnant, regarded by many as one of the best all around boxers of the time. The victory provided Durelle with the opportunity for his first chance to fight for a world title.

Light Heavyweight Title Fight 
Durelle's light-heavyweight championship fight against the great Archie Moore on December 10, 1958 at the Forum in Montreal, Quebec, is one of the most memorable fights in boxing history. Listed as a 4-to-1 underdog, Durelle became a legend in Canada after the bout. In one of the first fights broadcast coast-to-coast on American television, Durelle stunned boxing patrons by knocking the champion down 3 times in the first round. Under boxing rules today (except those of the World Boxing Council), the fight would have been stopped after three knockdowns in one round and Yvon Durelle would have been world champion. Also, he missed an opportunity when, after the first knockdown, he stood over Moore watching for several seconds before returning to his corner. As a result of his delay, the referee had to wait to begin the count, and Moore made it to his feet at the count of nine. Durelle would have likely won if he went to his corner. Durelle swarmed all over the champion for four more rounds and knocked him to the canvas again in round five but Moore held on and eventually wore Durelle down to retain his world championship with an eleventh-round knockout. The fight was the talk of the boxing world and members of the Canadian press voted it the sporting event of the year.  In an interview in 1994, Archie Moore, upon recounting the fight still hailed as classic, had this to say: "As the fight wore on and I got stronger, I thought to myself that this fella was the toughest man I'd ever fought. I turned professional in 1936 and fought until 1965--229 bouts. And I still think Durelle was the toughest man I ever faced."

From Boxing to Wrestling and back
Six months later, in June 1959, at Durelle's home village of Baie-Ste-Anne, thirty-five fishermen died when they were swept out to sea by 40-foot tidal waves that pounded the wharf. Distraught at the loss of friends and relatives, in August he lost in a world title fight rematch with Archie Moore by a third-round knockout. In November of that year he lost in 12 rounds to the Canadian heavyweight champion, George Chuvalo. Durelle fought only a few more times, before taking up professional wrestling in 1961. He returned to boxing in 1963 winning twice more before retiring permanently. He continued to earn a living at wrestling, primarily in eastern Canada but on occasion with Stu Hart's Stampede Wrestling, in Calgary, Alberta.

Later life and death
Despite his size and brutal profession, Durelle is often referred to as a modest and gentle man (his nickname was "doux", meaning "soft"). However, in the 1970s an event profoundly impacted him and his family when, in a bar that he owned and operated, he shot and killed a man who had attacked him. Charged with murder, he was defended by a young lawyer by the name of Frank McKenna and was acquitted on the grounds of self-defence. The trial received massive and sustained publicity and McKenna eventually went into politics and was elected premier of the province of New Brunswick.

Retired in his native village, a small museum with souvenirs of his twenty-year boxing career was built attached to his home where he and his wife of more than fifty years greeted fans who still showed up to see the New Brunswick boxer. In an article for ESPN.com about the most memorable matches in boxing history, current-day referee Mills Lane said: "I don't think you'll ever see a fight like Durelle-Moore again...That fight transcended what great fights are."

Durelle incurred a stroke on December 25, 2006, and died at age 77 on January 6, 2007, at the Moncton Hospital in Moncton, New Brunswick. He also had Parkinson's disease prior to this. His funeral was held on January 11, 2007, from Ste-Anne Roman Catholic Church in Baie-Ste-Anne, New Brunswick.

Professional boxing record

|-
| style="text-align:center;" colspan="8"|87 Wins (48 Knockouts), 24 Losses (9 Knockouts), 2 Draws, 1 No Contest 
|-  style="text-align:center; background:#e3e3e3;"
|  style="border-style:none none solid solid; "|Result
|  style="border-style:none none solid solid; "|Record
|  style="border-style:none none solid solid; "|Opponent
|  style="border-style:none none solid solid; "|Type
|  style="border-style:none none solid solid; "|Round
|  style="border-style:none none solid solid; "|Date
|  style="border-style:none none solid solid; "|Location
|  style="border-style:none none solid solid; "|Notes
|- align=center
|Loss
|87-24-2
|align=left| Jean-Claude Roy
|
|
|
|align=left|
|align=left|
|- align=center
|Win
|87-23-2
|align=left| Phonse LaSaga
|
|
|
|align=left|
|align=left|
|- align=center
|Win
|86-23-2
|align=left| Cecil Gray
|
|
|
|align=left|
|align=left|
|- align=center
|Loss
|85-23-2
|align=left| Paul Wright
|
|
|
|align=left|
|align=left|
|- align=center
|Win
|85-22-2
|align=left| John Armstrong
|
|
|
|align=left|
|align=left|
|- align=center
|Win
|84-22-2
|align=left| Ray Batey
|
|
|
|align=left|
|align=left|
|- align=center
|Win
|83-22-2
|align=left| Emile Dupre
|
|
|
|align=left|
|align=left|
|- align=center
|Loss
|82-22-2
|align=left| George Chuvalo
|
|
|
|align=left|
|align=left|
|- align=center
|Win
|82-21-2
|align=left| Young Beau Jack
|
|
|
|align=left|
|align=left|
|- align=center
|Win
|81-21-2
|align=left| Charlie Jones
|
|
|
|align=left|
|align=left|
|- align=center
|Win
|80-21-2
|align=left| Al Anderson
|
|
|
|align=left|
|align=left|
|- align=center
|Loss
|79-21-2
|align=left| Archie Moore
|
|
|
|align=left|
|align=left|
|- align=center
|Win
|79-20-2
|align=left| Teddy Burns
|
|
|
|align=left|
|align=left|
|- align=center
|Loss
|78-20-2
|align=left| Archie Moore
|
|
|
|align=left|
|align=left|
|- align=center
|Win
|78-19-2
|align=left| Louis Jones
|
|
|
|align=left|
|align=left|
|- align=center
|Win
|77-19-2
|align=left| Freddie Mack
|
|
|
|align=left|
|align=left|
|- align=center
|Win
|76-19-2
|align=left| Mike Holt
|
|
|
|align=left|
|align=left|
|- align=center
|Win
|75-19-2
|align=left| Germinal Ballarin
|
|
|
|align=left|
|align=left|
|- align=center
|Loss
|74-19-2
|align=left| Tony E. Anthony
|
|
|
|align=left|
|align=left|
|- align=center
|Win
|74-18-2
|align=left| Clarence Hinnant
|
|
|
|align=left|
|align=left|
|- align=center
|Win
|73-18-2
|align=left| Jerry Luedee
|
|
|
|align=left|
|align=left|
|- align=center
|Win
|72-18-2
|align=left| Mario Nini
|
|
|
|align=left|
|align=left|
|- align=center
|Win
|71-18-2
|align=left| Floyd McCoy
|
|
|
|align=left|
|align=left|
|- align=center
|Win
|70-18-2
|align=left| Willi Besmanoff
|
|
|
|align=left|
|align=left|
|- align=center
|Win
|69-18-2
|align=left| Tim Jones
|
|
|
|align=left|
|align=left|
|- align=center
|Win
|68-18-2
|align=left| Guenter Balzer
|
|
|
|align=left|
|align=left|
|- align=center
|style="background:#abcdef;"|Draw
|67-18-2
|align=left| Tony E. Anthony
|
|
|
|align=left|
|align=left|
|- align=center
|Win
|67-18-1
|align=left| Gordon Wallace
|
|
|
|align=left|
|align=left|
|- align=center
|Win
|66-18-1
|align=left| Leo Johnson
|
|
|
|align=left|
|align=left|
|- align=center
|Win
|65-18-1
|align=left| Angelo DeFendis
|
|
|
|align=left|
|align=left|
|- align=center
|Win
|64-18-1
|align=left| Clarence Floyd
|
|
|
|align=left|
|align=left|
|- align=center
|Loss
|63-18-1
|align=left| Clarence Hinnant
|
|
|
|align=left|
|align=left|
|- align=center
|Win
|63-17-1
|align=left| Bobby L. King
|
|
|
|align=left|
|align=left|
|- align=center
|Win
|62-17-1
|align=left| Chubby Wright
|
|
|
|align=left|
|align=left|
|- align=center
|Win
|61-17-1
|align=left| Gary Garafola
|
|
|
|align=left|
|align=left|
|- align=center
|Win
|60-17-1
|align=left| Wilfred Picot
|
|
|
|align=left|
|align=left|
|- align=center
|Win
|59-17-1
|align=left| Alvin Williams
|
|
|
|align=left|
|align=left|
|- align=center
|Win
|58-17-1
|align=left| Wilfred Picot
|
|
|
|align=left|
|align=left|
|- align=center
|Loss
|57-17-1
|align=left| Arthur Howard
|
|
|
|align=left|
|align=left|
|- align=center
|Win
|57-16-1
|align=left| Jerome Richardson
|
|
|
|align=left|
|align=left|
|- align=center
|Loss
|56-16-1
|align=left| Artie Towne
|
|
|
|align=left|
|align=left|
|- align=center
|Loss
|56-15-1
|align=left| Yolande Pompey
|
|
|
|align=left|
|align=left|
|- align=center
|Loss
|56-14-1
|align=left| Jimmy Slade
|
|
|
|align=left|
|align=left|
|- align=center
|Win
|56-13-1
|align=left| Billy Fifield
|
|
|
|align=left|
|align=left|
|- align=center
|Loss
|55-13-1
|align=left| Floyd Patterson
|
|
|
|align=left|
|align=left|
|- align=center
|Win
|55-12-1
|align=left| Jimmy J. Garcia
|
|
|
|align=left|
|align=left|
|- align=center
|Loss
|54-12-1
|align=left| Ron Barton
|
|
|
|align=left|
|align=left|
|- align=center
|Loss
|54-11-1
|align=left| Art Henri
|
|
|
|align=left|
|align=left|
|- align=center
|Loss
|54-10-1
|align=left| Gerhard Hecht
|
|
|
|align=left|
|align=left|
|- align=center
|Win
|54-9-1
|align=left| Gordon Wallace
|
|
|
|align=left|
|align=left|
|- align=center
|Win
|53-9-1
|align=left| Bob Isler
|
|
|
|align=left|
|align=left|
|- align=center
|Loss
|52-9-1
|align=left| Paul Andrews
|
|
|
|align=left|
|align=left|
|- align=center
|Win
|52-8-1
|align=left| Doug Harper
|
|
|
|align=left|
|align=left|
|- align=center
|Win
|51-8-1
|align=left| Jerome Richardson
|
|
|
|align=left|
|align=left|
|- align=center
|Win
|50-8-1
|align=left| Sampson Powell
|
|
|
|align=left|
|align=left|
|- align=center
|Win
|49-8-1
|align=left| Charley E. Chase
|
|
|
|align=left|
|align=left|
|- align=center
|Win
|48-8-1
|align=left| Billy Fifield
|
|
|
|align=left|
|align=left|
|- align=center
|Loss
|47-8-1
|align=left| Waddell Hanna
|
|
|
|align=left|
|align=left|
|- align=center
|Loss
|47-7-1
|align=left| Floyd Patterson
|
|
|
|align=left|
|align=left|
|- align=center
|style="background:#abcdef;"|Draw
|47-6-1
|align=left| Doug Harper
|
|
|
|align=left|
|align=left|
|- align=center
|Loss
|47-6
|align=left| Doug Harper
|
|
|
|align=left|
|align=left|
|- align=center
|Win
|47-5
|align=left| Gordon Wallace
|
|
|
|align=left|
|align=left|
|- align=center
|Win
|46-5
|align=left| Al Winn
|
|
|
|align=left|
|align=left|
|- align=center
|Win
|45-5
|align=left| Melvin Wade
|
|
|
|align=left|
|align=left|
|- align=center
|Win
|44-5
|align=left| Gordon Wallace
|
|
|
|align=left|
|align=left|
|- align=center
|Win
|43-5
|align=left| Wilfredo Miro
|
|
|
|align=left|
|align=left|
|- align=center
|Win
|42-5
|align=left| Curtis Wade
|
|
|
|align=left|
|align=left|
|- align=center
|Win
|41-5
|align=left| Archie Hannigan
|
|
|
|align=left|
|align=left|
|- align=center
|Win
|40-5
|align=left| Joey Greco
|
|
|
|align=left|
|align=left|
|- align=center
|Win
|39-5
|align=left| Curtis Wade
|
|
|
|align=left|
|align=left|
|- align=center
|Win
|38-5
|align=left| Harry Poulton
|
|
|
|align=left|
|align=left|
|- align=center
|Win
|37-5
|align=left| Tony Amato
|
|
|
|align=left|
|align=left|
|- align=center
|Win
|36-5
|align=left| George Ross
|
|
|
|align=left|
|align=left|
|- align=center
|Win
|35-5
|align=left| Jimmy Nolan
|
|
|
|align=left|
|align=left|
|- align=center
|Win
|34-5
|align=left| Hurley Sanders
|
|
|
|align=left|
|align=left|
|- align=center
|Loss
|33-5
|align=left| Hurley Sanders
|
|
|
|align=left|
|align=left|
|- align=center
|Win
|33-4
|align=left| Eddie Zastre
|
|
|
|align=left|
|align=left|
|- align=center
|Win
|32-4
|align=left| Cobey McCluskey
|
|
|
|align=left|
|align=left|
|- align=center
|Win
|31-4
|align=left| Arnold Fleiger
|
|
|
|align=left|
|align=left|
|- align=center
|style="background:#dae2f1;"|NC
|31-4
|align=left| Cobey McCluskey
|
|
|
|align=left|
|align=left|
|- align=center
|Win
|30-4
|align=left| Bob Stecher
|
|
|
|align=left|
|align=left|
|- align=center
|Win
|29-4
|align=left| Tiger Warrington
|
|
|
|align=left|
|align=left|
|- align=center
|Win
|28-4
|align=left| Alvin Upshaw
|
|
|
|align=left|
|align=left|
|- align=center
|Loss
|27-4
|align=left| Cobey McCluskey
|
|
|
|align=left|
|align=left|
|- align=center
|Win
|27-3
|align=left| Al Couture
|
|
|
|align=left|
|align=left|
|- align=center
|Win
|26-3
|align=left| Ossie Farrell
|
|
|
|align=left|
|align=left|
|- align=center
|Loss
|25-3
|align=left| Cobey McCluskey
|
|
|
|align=left|
|align=left|
|- align=center
|Win
|25-2
|align=left| Tiger Warrington
|
|
|
|align=left|
|align=left|
|- align=center
|Win
|24-2
|align=left| Coot O'Rea
|
|
|
|align=left|
|align=left|
|- align=center
|Win
|23-2
|align=left| Alvin Upshaw
|
|
|
|align=left|
|align=left|
|- align=center
|Loss
|22-2
|align=left| Roy Wouters
|
|
|
|align=left|
|align=left|
|- align=center
|Win
|22-1
|align=left| Eddie Hamilton
|
|
|
|align=left|
|align=left|
|- align=center
|Win
|21-1
|align=left| Bob Stecher
|
|
|
|align=left|
|align=left|
|- align=center
|Win
|20-1
|align=left| Ossie Farrell
|
|
|
|align=left|
|align=left|
|- align=center
|Win
|19-1
|align=left| Bernard McCluskey
|
|
|
|align=left|
|align=left|
|- align=center
|Win
|18-1
|align=left| Pat Davis
|
|
|
|align=left|
|align=left|
|- align=center
|Win
|17-1
|align=left| Bill McLaughlin
|
|
|
|align=left|
|align=left|
|- align=center
|Win
|16-1
|align=left| Kid Wolfe
|
|
|
|align=left|
|align=left|
|- align=center
|Win
|15-1
|align=left| Billy Landry
|
|
|
|align=left|
|align=left|
|- align=center
|Win
|14-1
|align=left| Cobey McCluskey
|
|
|
|align=left|
|align=left|
|- align=center
|Win
|13-1
|align=left| Jimmy Mooney
|
|
|
|align=left|
|align=left|
|- align=center
|Win
|12-1
|align=left| Cobey McCluskey
|
|
|
|align=left|
|align=left|
|- align=center
|Win
|11-1
|align=left| Joe Tyne
|
|
|
|align=left|
|align=left|
|- align=center
|Win
|10-1
|align=left| Manuel Leek
|
|
|
|align=left|
|align=left|
|- align=center
|Win
|9-1
|align=left| Harry Poulton
|
|
|
|align=left|
|align=left|
|- align=center
|Win
|8-1
|align=left| Harry Poulton
|
|
|
|align=left|
|align=left|
|- align=center
|Win
|7-1
|align=left| Crosley Irvine
|
|
|
|align=left|
|align=left|
|- align=center
|Win
|6-1
|align=left| Al Batten
|
|
|
|align=left|
|align=left|
|- align=center
|Loss
|5-1
|align=left| Billy Snowball
|
|
|
|align=left|
|align=left|
|- align=center
|Win
|5-0
|align=left| Al Batten
|
|
|
|align=left|
|align=left|
|- align=center
|Win
|4-0
|align=left| Percy R. Richardson
|
|
|
|align=left|
|align=left|
|- align=center
|Win
|3-0
|align=left| Al Fraser
|
|
|
|align=left|
|align=left|
|- align=center
|Win
|2-0
|align=left| Al Fraser
|
|
|
|align=left|
|align=left|
|- align=center
|Win
|1-0
|align=left| Sonny Ramsay
|
|
|
|align=left|
|align=left|
|}

Related works
 Yvon Durelle's biography, The Fighting Fisherman: The Life of Yvon Durelle by author Raymond Fraser (Doubleday), published in 1981, republished in 2005.
 In 2003, Ginette Pellerin of the National Film Board of Canada made a French film documentary on his life called Durelle.

Awards and recognition
Inducted into the New Brunswick Sports Hall of Fame in 1971
Inducted into the Canadian Sports Hall of Fame in 1975
Inducted into the Canadian Boxing Hall of Fame in 1989

References

Fraser, Raymond. The Fighting Fisherman : The Life of Yvon Durelle  Doubleday & Company  (1981 – rereleased 2005)

External links
Obituary for Yvon Durelle from Bell's Funeral Home in Miramichi, New Brunswick, Canada

Website for Yvon Durelle

1929 births
2007 deaths
Acadian people
Canadian male professional wrestlers
Light-heavyweight boxers
Professional wrestlers from New Brunswick
Sportspeople from New Brunswick
New Brunswick Sports Hall of Fame inductees
People from Northumberland County, New Brunswick
Canadian male boxers
Stampede Wrestling alumni